The 2023 European 10 m Events Championships was held from 5 to 13 March 2023 in Tallinn, Estonia. There are 8 places awarded at the 2024 Summer Olympics and 48 places at the 2023 European Games.

Schedule
Finals schedule

Medalists

Medal Table

Seniors

Juniors

Olympic quotas

Participating nations

 (4)
 (7)
 (25)
 (20)
 (4)
 (5)
 (11)
 (17)
 (26)
 (7)
 (40)
 (10)
 (7)
 (10)
 (25)
 (6)
 (3)
 (31)
 (4)
 (26)
 (2)
 (14)
 (12)
 (1)
 (2)
 (6)
 (4)
 (3)
 (23)
 (22)
 (9)
 (7)
 (22)
 (7)
 (11)
 (15)
 (18)
 (13)
 (18)
 (24)

References

External links
Official site

2023 in shooting sports
Shooting
International sports competitions hosted by Estonia
European 10 m Events Championships
Sports competitions in Tallinn
European 10 m Events Championships